The 2012–13 Wyoming Cowboys basketball team represented the University of Wyoming during the 2012–2013 NCAA Division I men's basketball season. Their head coach was Larry Shyatt in his second year. They played their home games at the Arena-Auditorium in Laramie, Wyoming. The Cowboys were a member of the Mountain West Conference. They finished with a record of 20–14 overall, 4–12 in Mountain West play for an eighth-place finish. They lost in the quarterfinals to New Mexico in the Mountain West tournament. They were invited to the 2013 College Basketball Invitational where they defeated Lehigh in the first round before losing in the quarterfinals to Western Michigan.

Roster

Statistics

Schedule and results

|-
!colspan=9 style="background:#492f24; color:#ffc425;"| Exhibition

|-
!colspan=9 style="background:#492f24; color:#ffc425;"| Regular season

|-
!colspan=9 style="background:#492f24; color:#ffc425;"| Mountain West tournament

|-
!colspan=9 style="background:#492f24; color:#ffc425;"| 2013 CBI

References

Wyoming Cowboys basketball seasons
Wyoming
Wyoming
Wyoming Cowboys bask
Wyoming Cowboys bask